The Principality of Murom was a medieval Rus' lordship based on the city of Murom, now in Vladimir Oblast, Russia. Murom lay in an area that was strongly Finnic and for much of its medieval history, located in the homeland of the Muromians. It appears to have been an important Finnic settlement in the ninth-century, with an archaeologically noticeable Scandinavian presence from the tenth-century, as evidenced by Frankish swords, a tortoiseshell brooch and a sword chape.

The Primary Chronicle alleges that Murom came under Rus' control in the eighth-century. Gleb Vladimirovich, son of Vladimir the Great, ruled the principality in the early eleventh-century. Murom was part of the territory of the Principality of Chernigov in the late eleventh-century, controlled by the Sviatoslavichi clan, the descendants of Iaroslav the Wise; probably it was retained by Vsevolod Iaroslavich even after this Prince of Chernigov  became Grand Prince in 1076.

Oleg Sviatoslavich, grandson of Iaroslav and Prince of Chernigov, ruled Murom through a posadnik in the early 1090s, and it was recognised as Oleg's sphere of influence at the Liubech Conference of 1097. Here Oleg's brother Davyd was made co-ruler of Chernigov, and Oleg's lands were parcelled out between Oleg, Davyd and their brother Iaroslav; the latter obtained Murom with Ryazan.

Murom appears to have been destroyed or at least devastated by the Mongol Invasion of Rus' in 1237-8. Khan Batu came to the frontier of Ryazan in the winter of 1237, and demanded tribute from the princes of Ryazan, Murom and Pronsk. This was rejected, and devastation of these lands followed.

In 1392 Vasily Dmitr'evich, Prince of Moscow and Grand Prince of Vladimir, obtained a patent from Khan Tokhtamysh authorising the annexation of the Murom principality, along with the principalities of Nizhni Novgorod and Gorodets.

List of princes of Murom

Iaroslav Sviatoslavich, 1097–1129
Iurii Iaroslavich, 1129–1143
Sviatoslav Iaroslavich, 1143–1145
Rostislav Iaroslavich, 1145–1147
Vladimir Sviatoslavich, 1147–1149
Rostislav Iaroslavich (again), 1149–1155
Vladimir Sviatoslavich (again), 1155–1161
Iurii Vladimirovich, 1161–1174
 Vladimir Yuryevich, ?–1203
 Davyd Yuryevich, 1203–1228
 Iurii Davydovich, ?–1237
Igor Yuryevich, 1203–?
Iaroslav Yuryevich, 1237–?

After Iaroslav and the destruction of Murom by the Mongols, the princes of Murom disappear for nearly a century, resuming with:
Vasily Iaroslavich, ?–1344 x 8
Iurii Iaroslavich, 1344 x 8–1353
Fedor Glebovich, 1353–x 1392

Notes

References
Dimnik, Martin, The Dynasty of Chernigov, 1146-1246, (Cambridge, 2003)
Franklin, Simon, and Shepard, Jonathan, The Emergence of Rus, 750-1200, (Longman History of Russia, Harlow, 1996)
Martin, Janet, Medieval Russia, 980-1584, (Cambridge, 1995)

Subdivisions of Kievan Rus'
Medieval Russia